Rouchdi Redouane (born 1979) is an Algerian writer and journalist. He has published across several genres including poetry, fiction and non-fiction. His books of poetry include: For Example (2010) and 33 (2013). He has won several prizes for his poetry, among them the President of the Republic Prize for Poetry (2008) and the Al-Babtain Prize for Young Poets (2016). In 2013, he published a book of travel writing titled Rixos.. Before the Fall of Gaddafi. In 2022, his novel The Hungarian was nominated for the Arabic Booker Prize.

References

Algerian writers
1979 births
Living people